Andrew Kelly (born 9 January 1984) is an English former footballer who last played for Landskrona in Sweden.

Having previously played for Köping FF, Kelly joined Landskrona in September 2004. He made his debut in the local derby against Helsingborgs IF in 2005 – a classic match for all Landskrona supporters since the game ended with a 4–3 win, and a goal in the 93rd minute.

In July 2005, he returned for a second spell on loan at Västerås SK.

On 16 May 2009, it was announced that he would leave Landskrona and move back to England.

References

1984 births
Living people
Footballers from Stockton-on-Tees
Footballers from County Durham
English footballers
Association football defenders
Middlesbrough F.C. players
MD FF Köping players
Landskrona BoIS players
Västerås SK Fotboll players
Allsvenskan players
English expatriate footballers
Expatriate footballers in Sweden